Ndombe may be,

Ndombe language, Angola
Ndombe Opetum (Pepe Ndombe)
Firmin Ndombe Mubele

See also
Mai-Ndombe Province
Lake Mai-Ndombe